Wa Wa Nee was a 1980s Australian funk band.

Career
Singer/songwriter Paul Gray and guitarist Steve Williams formed the band in 1982. They were joined by Geoff Lundren (bass), Elizabeth Lord (keyboards, backing vocals) and Chris Sweeney (drums) and signed with CBS Records in 1985. Mark Gray, Paul's brother, and Phil Witchett joined the group soon after and their debut single "Stimulation" was released in April 1986. The song peaked at number 2 in Australia. "I Could Make You Love Me" was released in August 1986 and peaked at number 5. In November 1986, Wa Wa Nee released their debut self-titled album which peaked at number 29 in Australia. Two more singles were released from the album, "Sugar Free" in December 1986 gave the band a third Australian Top 10 hit, and "One and One (Ain't I Good Enough)" in April 1987 which peaked inside the Top 20. "Sugar Free" was released in the United States in July 1987 and peaked at number 35 on the Billboard Hot 100. The song featured in the film, Cassandra. "Stimulation" was released as the follow-up single where it peaked at number 86. It was featured in the film Satisfaction. In 1987, a remix album, titled Ulta Mixes was released.

During the recording of the second studio album in 1988, keyboardist Phil Witchett died. In November 1988, "Can't Control Myself" was released as the lead single from the band's second studio album. The song peaked at number 31. Their second studio album, Blush was released in May 1989, and spawned two more Top 100 hits in Australia, "So Good" and "I Want You". The group disbanded later in 1989.

Later works
After the dissolution of Wa Wa Nee, Bassist Mark Gray went on to work with Tania Bowra Band, with James Reyne and Indecent Obsession.

Steve Williams went on to work with James Freud Band, Mama's Darlings and Richard Clapton. He relocated to Europe before returning to live in Australia. In 2006, he was involved in a Led Zeppelin covers band called The Zep Boys.

Paul Gray worked with Deni Hines, CDB, Kate Ceberano, Tina Arena and Bardot as a keyboard player, musical director, songwriter and producer. Paul Gray appeared in the Countdown Spectacular 2 concert series in Australia between late August and early September 2007 as a performer and musical director.  He sang two songs: "Stimulation" and "Sugar Free". He has also appeared with 80s Enuff and Idols of the 80s. Gray performed Wa Wa Nee hits on 28 March 2010, at a fundraiser for the children of Jenin, a devastated area of the West Bank, Palestine. All funds went directly to the building of a pre-school in the area. Gray performed at local music venues in Melbourne in 2010, with fellow 1980s hitmakers, Scott Carne (Kids in the Kitchen) and Brian Mannix (Uncanny X-Men). Paul Gray supported Belinda Carlisle on some of her dates of her 2011 Australian Tour. Wa Wa Nee also supported Rick Astley during his 2012 and 2014 tour of Australia.

Singer Paul Gray died of multiple myeloma on 24 April 2018, aged 54. The news was announced by his brother and fellow band member, Mark.

Discography

Studio albums

Remix and compilation albums

Singles

Awards and nominations

ARIA Music Awards
The ARIA Music Awards is an annual awards ceremony that recognises excellence, innovation, and achievement across all genres of Australian music. They commenced in 1987.

|-
| rowspan="4" | ARIA Music Awards of 1987
| "Stimulation"
| ARIA Award for Highest Selling Single
| 
|-
| themselves
| ARIA Award for Best New Talent
| 
|-
| Paul Gray – Wa Wa Nee ("Stimulation", "I Could Make You Love Me")
| ARIA Award for Best Songwriter
| 
|-
| Jim Tait for Wa Wa Nee by Wa Wa Nee
| ARIA Award for Engineer of the Year
|

Countdown Australian Music Awards
Countdown was an Australian pop music TV series on national broadcaster ABC-TV from 1974 to 1987, it presented music awards from 1979 to 1987, initially in conjunction with magazine TV Week. The TV Week / Countdown Awards were a combination of popular-voted and peer-voted awards.

|-
| rowspan="4" |1986
| Wa Wa Nee
| Best Debut Album
| 
|-
| "Stimulation"
| Best Debut Single
| 
|-
| rowspan="2" | themselves
| Best Debut Act
| 
|-
| Most Popular Australian Group
|

See also
 List of 1980s one-hit wonders in the United States

References

External links
 [ Wa Wa Nee] at AllMusic

Australian new wave musical groups
Australian pop music groups
Australian funk musical groups
Musical groups established in 1982
Musical groups disestablished in 1989
1982 establishments in Australia
1989 disestablishments in Australia